The Russell Girl is a 2008 American drama television film directed by Jeff Bleckner and written by Jill Blotevogel. It stars Amber Tamblyn as a young medical student who must come to terms with her past. Mary Elizabeth Mastrantonio, Jennifer Ehle, and Henry Czerny co-star. The film premiered on CBS on January 27, 2008, as part of the Hallmark Hall of Fame anthology series.

Synopsis
Sarah Russell is a young woman who has recently discovered that she has leukemia right before she also discovers that she has been accepted to Northwestern University's medical program. She decides to put her school on hold so she can travel back home to tell her parents Gayle and Phil about her recent diagnosis. However at the same time Sarah is convinced that this is retribution for a tragic accident that involved her neighbor Lorainne's baby.

Cast
 Amber Tamblyn as Sarah Russell
 Mary Elizabeth Mastrantonio as Gayle Russell
 Jennifer Ehle as Lorainne Morrissey
 Henry Czerny as Howard Morrisey
 Paul Wesley as Evan Carroll
 Tim DeKay as Phil Russell
 Daniel Clark as Daniel Russell
 Ben Lewis as Jon Morrissey
 Max Morrow as Rick Morrissey
 Richard Leacock as Dr. Gordon
 Richard Fitzpatrick as Ray
 Rebecca Dreiling as Karaoke Girl
 Max MacBride as Young Jon
 William Cuddy as Young Rick
 Paula Barrett as Fran

Production
Filming took place in Toronto.

Reception
Critical reception has been mixed. Variety's Laura Fries wrote "On paper, writer Jill Blotevogel’s script is standard TV melodrama, but Tamblyn’s deeply expressive performance, along with that of Tony-winner Ehle, creates believably heart-wrenching emotions. “The Russell Girl” proves Tamblyn can carry a film. Ehle, bearing an uncanny resemblance to Meryl Streep, is as good onscreen as onstage. She went on to offer "Supporting performances are well done and key to the overall story, especially the father figures eloquently portrayed by DeKay and Henry Czerny. Paul Wesley as Evan, Sarah’s old flame, is a little too good to be true but is a charismatic match to Tamblyn’s Sarah." Post Gazette noted the film's focus on the difficulties of reconciliation and forgiveness, and praised the film's acting. Noted Tamblyn regarding the title character: "There is something lovely about her, that in the face of something terrifying, she has to go back and see things that were never faced before."

References

External links
 

2008 television films
2008 films
2008 drama films
2000s American films
2000s English-language films
American drama television films
CBS network films
Films about cancer in the United States
Films directed by Jeff Bleckner
Films scored by Jeff Beal
Films shot in Toronto
Hallmark Hall of Fame episodes